The University of Iowa College of Dentistry is the dental school of the University of Iowa. It is located in Iowa City, Iowa, United States. It is the only dental school in Iowa and is one of only two dental colleges in the United States to offer all the American Dental Association (ADA) accredited dental specialty training programs. It is consistently rated as a top dental school in the country with strong clinical training and research exposure for dental students. Several Iowa alumni serve in leadership positions in academics and in organized dentistry.

History 
University of Iowa College of Dentistry was established in 1882. It is the third oldest surviving dental school west of the Mississippi River.

Academics 
University of Iowa College of Dentistry awards following degrees:
Doctor of Dental Surgery (D.D.S)
Certificate in all ADA accredited residencies
Master of Science (M.S.) in Oral Science
Doctor of Philosophy (Ph.D) in Oral Science

Departments 
University of Iowa College of Dentistry includes the following departments:

Department of Endodontics
Department of Family Dentistry
Department of Operative Dentistry
Department of Oral & Maxillofacial Surgery
Department of Oral Pathology, Radiology & Medicine
Department of Orthodontics
Department of Pediatric Dentistry
Department of Periodontics
Department of Preventive & Community Dentistry
Department of Prosthodontics

Accreditation 
University of Iowa College of Dentistry is currently accredited by ADA.

Notable graduates
 Martin Dewey, Class of 1902
 Sheldon Golomb
 Samir Bishara
 Robert Moyers
 Rafiuddin Ahmad - Father of Modern Dentistry in India

References 

Dental schools in Iowa
Dentistry
Educational institutions established in 1882
1882 establishments in Iowa